Labdia stagmatophorella is a moth in the family Cosmopterigidae. It is found in the Russian Far East and Japan.

References

Natural History Museum Lepidoptera generic names catalog

Labdia
Moths described in 1993